The 1979 Estonian SSR Football Championship was won by Norma.

League table

References

Estonian Football Championship
Est
Football